Climat, CLIMAT or climat  may refer to:

CLIMAT, a code for reporting climatological data
Lieu-dit, a French wine term
climat, the French word for climate